The 1929 Mississippi College Choctaws football team was an American football team that represented Mississippi College as a member of the Southern Intercollegiate Athletic Association (SIAA) during the 1929 college football season. In their sixth year under head coach Stanley L. Robinson, the team compiled a 3–6–1 record.

Schedule

References

Mississippi College
Mississippi College Choctaws football seasons
Mississippi College Choctaws football